The 1999 season is the 47th year in Guangzhou Football Club's existence, their 33rd season in the Chinese football league and the 7th season in the professional football league.

2000
Guangzhou Apollo